Bergantiños Fútbol Club is a Spanish football team based in Carballo, Province of A Coruña, in the autonomous community of Galicia. Founded in 1923, it plays in Segunda División RFEF - Group 1, playing home matches at Estadio As Eiroas, with a capacity of 5,000 seats.

Season to season

2 seasons in Segunda División B
2 seasons in Segunda División RFEF
23 seasons in Tercera División

Honours
Tercera División: 1993–94

Famous players
 Dmitri Radchenko
 Angeliño

External links
Official website 
Futbolme team profile 

Football clubs in Galicia (Spain)
Association football clubs established in 1923
1923 establishments in Spain
Divisiones Regionales de Fútbol clubs